Ganatantra ("Democracy") was an Odia-language newspaper published in Odisha, India between 1956 and 1961. Initially Ganatantra was published from Bolangir, later moving to Cuttack. It started as a weekly newspaper, later converted into a daily. Surendra Mohanty was the editor of the newspaper. Ganatantra was published by Rajendra Narayan Singhdeo, the maharaja of Bolangir, and was politically aligned with the Ganatantra Parishad party.

References

Daily newspapers published in India
Odia-language newspapers
Publications established in 1956
1956 establishments in Orissa
1961 disestablishments in India